is a Japanese sports manga series written and illustrated by Satoru Noda. The series follows a figure skater who, after moving to Hokkaido following the death of his mother, begins playing ice hockey. 

The series was originally serialized in the manga magazine Weekly Young Jump from July 2011 to November 2012. Supinamarada! was a commercial failure during its initial serialization, though acclaim for Noda's subsequent manga series Golden Kamuy led to renewed critical recognition for the series. A relaunch of Supinamarada! was announced and will begin serialization in Weekly Young Jump in 2023.

Synopsis
Fifteen year old figure skater Shirakawa Rou's mother dies in a car accident the day before his qualifying performance for the Olympic Games, rendering him grief-stricken and unable to compete. Now orphaned, Shirakawa and his twin sister Haruna are forced to relocate from Tokyo to the home of their maternal grandfather in Tomakomai, Hokkaido. After an encounter with the hockey-loving Genma brothers, Shirakawa decides to join the school's ice hockey team. The series follows Shirakawa as he learns to play the sport and competes against the hockey teams of rival schools.

Production
Supinamarada! was creator Satoru Noda's first manga series after nearly a decade as an artist assistant. Noda has stated that the inspiration for Supinamarada! was a desire to create a story that was both about hockey and set in his home of Hokkaido. While sports manga about hockey have been produced in the past, notably My Heavenly Hockey Club and Go!! Southern Ice Hockey Club, Noda has remarked that relative to other sports, hockey is not a ubiquitous sport in the medium.

Publication
The series was serialized in the manga magazine Weekly Young Jump from 14 July 2011 to 1 November 2012. A one-shot spin-off chapter was later published in the February 2013 issue of the manga magazine . On 28 April 2022 Weekly Young Jump announced that it would relaunch the series, though a specific publication date was not given until 11 November 2022 that the series will relaunch in spring 2023.

Volume list
The series has been collected into six tankōbon (bound volumes) published by Shueisha:

Reception
In an interview with Asahi Shimbun, Noda stated that Supinamarada! was a commercial failure during its initial serialization, and was discontinued after 15 months at the recommendation of his editor. Noda has speculated that the series' hard-to-remember title and slow initial chapters may have contributed to its inability to find an audience. The widespread acclaim for Noda's subsequent manga series Golden Kamuy has led to renewed critical recognition for Supinamarada!; the works are linked through the Supinamarada! character Toshimitsu Nihei, whose name and character design are identical to Tetsuzō Nihei of Golden Kamuy.

Notes

References

Ice hockey books
Seinen manga
Shueisha manga
Sports anime and manga